Ramos v. Louisiana, 590 U.S. ___ (2020), was a U.S. Supreme Court decision in which the Court ruled that the Sixth Amendment to the U.S. Constitution requires that guilty verdicts be unanimous in trials for serious crimes. Only cases in Oregon and Louisiana were affected by the ruling because every other state already had this requirement. The decision incorporated the Sixth Amendment requirement for unanimous jury criminal convictions against the states, and thereby overturned the Court's previous decision from the 1972 cases Apodaca v. Oregon and Johnson v. Louisiana.

Background
The Sixth Amendment to the United States Constitution defines procedures for prosecution of criminal cases against individuals, parts of which have been incorporated against states by various Supreme Court decisions under the Due Process Clause of the Fourteenth Amendment. The Sixth Amendment assures a jury trial for a person charged on a criminal offense, but does not specify the process around that trial, leaving it for states to define within their own constitutions.

While federal law mandated that a federal jury trial require a unanimous vote to convict a suspect on a criminal charge, the 1972 Supreme Court case Apodaca v. Oregon ruled that states did not have to follow this. All but two states adopted unanimous jury votes to convict. Oregon allowed a jury vote of 10–2 or more for conviction (which Apodaca v. Oregon had challenged), while Louisiana, until 2019, had similarly allowed a 10–2 jury vote to convict (which Johnson v. Louisiana had challenged), but since had passed a new constitutional amendment requiring a unanimous jury vote, applying to all criminal charges placed on January 1, 2019, or later.

The present case's petitioner, Evangelisto Ramos, had been convicted of murder in Louisiana on a 10–2 vote in 2016, before the passage of the new constitutional amendment. Ramos appealed the conviction on the issue around the non-unanimous jury factor, arguing that the law, established in 1898, was a Jim Crow law that allowed for racial discrimination within juries. The Louisiana Court of Appeal, Fourth Circuit upheld his sentence in a November 2017 opinion.

Ramos petitioned to the U.S. Supreme Court on the question "Whether the Fourteenth Amendment fully incorporates the Sixth Amendment guarantee of a unanimous verdict". The Court accepted the case in March 2019. Oral hearings for the case were held on October 7, 2019.

Decision

Majority opinions 
In a 6–3 decision, the Court reversed the decision against Ramos and ruled that the unanimity of a jury vote for conviction mandated by the Sixth Amendment for serious crimes must also be an incorporated right against the states, overturning Apodaca v. Oregon. Justice Neil Gorsuch wrote the majority opinion, joined in parts by justices Ruth Bader Ginsburg, Sonia Sotomayor, Stephen Breyer, and Brett Kavanaugh, which holds that the guarantee is incorporated by the Due Process Clause of the Fourteenth Amendment. Clarence Thomas joined in the judgment only, arguing instead that it is incorporated by the Privileges or Immunities Clause of the Fourteenth Amendment.

Dissenting opinions 
Justice Samuel Alito wrote the dissent joined by Chief Justice John Roberts and in part by Elena Kagan. Alito wrote that the Court should uphold the principle of stare decisis since both Oregon and Louisiana have used the ruling from Apodaca v. Oregon for more than forty years.

Subsequent cases 

The majority opinion in Ramos v. Louisiana considered whether prisoners may seek collateral review to challenge non-unanimous convictions, but declined to decide the issue. While all defendants who had not yet exhausted their appeals were expected to be granted new trials, the Supreme Court did not address the issue of whether or not defendants who had exhausted all appeals can be covered by Ramos.

Thedrick Edwards, a different Louisiana inmate convicted 10–2, had been challenging Louisiana's non-unanimous jury conviction law since his own 2007 conviction, had petitioned to the Supreme Court around the same time that Ramos had been under consideration, using collateral review (Ramos dealt with direct review). Following the decision of Ramos, Edwards altered his petition to the Supreme Court to ask if the Ramos decision should be held retroactively to defendants who had already exhausted all appeals. The court accepted Edwards' case under Edwards v. Vannoy, and oral arguments were held on December 2, 2020.

On May 17, 2021, the Supreme Court ruled that the Ramos jury-unanimity rule does not apply retroactively on federal collateral review. Subsequently, the Oregon Supreme Court ruled in December 2022 that the Ramos decision should be applied retroactively to cases within the state.

References

External links
 

United States Supreme Court cases
United States Supreme Court cases of the Roberts Court
United States Sixth Amendment sentencing case law
United States Federal Sentencing Guidelines case law
2020 in United States case law
21st-century American trials
Legal history of Louisiana
United States jury case law